
Gmina Brzeszcze is an urban-rural gmina (administrative district) in Oświęcim County, Lesser Poland Voivodeship, in southern Poland.

Villages
Apart from the town of Brzeszcze, Gmina Brzeszcze contains the villages and settlements of Jawiszowice, Przecieszyn, Skidziń, Wilczkowice and Zasole.

Neighbouring gminas
Gmina Brzeszcze is bordered by the gminas of Kęty, Miedźna, Oświęcim and Wilamowice.

References
Polish official population figures 2006

Brzeszcze
Oświęcim County